Duken Holo Tutakitoa-Williams (born 17 August 1998) is a Niuean boxer and the first Niue athlete competing in the Commonwealth Games history to win Niue Island's first ever medal.

Williams is from the village of Liku, Niue.

In April 2022, he won the New Zealand national cruiserweight title.

In June 2022, he was selected for Niue's team for the 2022 Commonwealth Games in Birmingham. At the games he defeated the Cook Islands' Michael Schuster to secure a place in the heavyweight semi-final. The victory guaranteed him at least the bronze, making him Niue's first Commonwealth games medalist.

References

Living people
1998 births
Niuean male boxers
Commonwealth Games competitors for Niue
Boxers at the 2022 Commonwealth Games
Commonwealth Games medallists in boxing
Commonwealth Games bronze medallists
Medallists at the 2022 Commonwealth Games